Elizabeth Moore (15 September 1944 – 13 August 1976) was a British sculptor, known for working in the props for various films.

Biography
Some of Moore's best-known credits include 2001: A Space Odyssey (1968), A Clockwork Orange (1971) and Star Wars (1977) (where she sculpted C-3PO and stormtrooper helmets).

On 13 August 1976, while working on A Bridge Too Far (released 1977), Moore died in the Netherlands in a road accident, in a car driven by the special effects designer, John Richardson.

References

External links
 

1976 deaths
1944 births
20th-century British sculptors
British women sculptors
British women painters
20th-century British painters
Road incident deaths in the Netherlands
20th-century British women artists